Major-General Sir Wilfrid Malleson  (8 September 1866 – 24 January 1946) was a major-general in the British Indian Army who led a mission to Turkestan during the Russian Civil War.

Life 

Malleson born in  Baldersby, Yorkshire. was commissioned into the Royal Artillery in 1886. In 1904 he transferred to the Indian Army and accompanied Sir Louis Dane on his mission to Kabul, Afghanistan, 1904–1905. He was posted to British East Africa, where he was appointed Inspector General of Communications. He participated in the Battle of Salaita and the Battle of Latema Nek.

He was appointed a Companion of the Order of the Bath in August 1916.

He then led the British Military Mission to Turkestan between 16 July 1918 – 5 April 1919, aiming to block possible German-Turkish thrusts towards India and Afghanistan. In August 1918, he dispatched a British Indian Army force consisting of a machine gun detachment comprising  40 Punjabi troops and a British officer to resist the Bolsheviks near Meru in what was the first direct confrontation between British and Russian troops since the Crimea War. He led the Malleson Mission an effort to curtail German and Turkish influence in the area, and to assist the Transcaspian Government against the Bolsheviks in the Russian Civil War. Malleson was forced to withdraw in April 1919 however.

Later he participated in the Third Anglo-Afghan War in 1919. He was involved in military intelligence, running a spy network from Meshed in north-eastern Iran against the Russians during this period. For his services, Malleson was knighted as a Knight Commander of the Order of the Indian Empire (KCIE) on 1 January 1920.

He retired from the Indian Army on 30 October 1920.

Personal aspects 
In 1894, he married Ida Kathleen King, daughter of Frederick St Aubyn King. Their son Wilfred St. Aubyn Malleson was awarded the Victoria Cross.

He died in Newton Abbot in 1946.

See also
 Allied intervention in the Russian Civil War

Notes

References

 Milton, Giles Russian Roulette: How British Spies Thwarted Lenin's Global Plot, Sceptre, 2013. .
 Historical Dictionary of Turkmenistan, by Rafis Abazov, Scarecrow Press, 2005.
 
 On Secret Service East of Constantinople, by Peter Hopkirk, John Murray 1994, p. 340.

1866 births
1946 deaths
Allied intervention in the Russian Civil War
Royal Artillery officers
Indian Army generals of World War I
British military personnel of the Russian Civil War
British Indian Army generals
Companions of the Order of the Bath
Knights Commander of the Order of the Indian Empire
British military personnel of the Third Anglo-Afghan War
People from the Borough of Harrogate
Military personnel from Yorkshire